Hamzeh, also rendered as Khamzeh, may refer to:
 Hamzeh, Ilam (حمزه - Ḩamzeh)
 Hamzeh, Khuzestan (حمزه - Ḩamzeh)
 Hamzeh-ye Olya, Khuzestan Province
 Hamzeh-ye Sofla, Khuzestan Province

See also
 Shahrak-e Hamzeh (disambiguation)